“The Magic Violin” (Ukrainian name Чарівна Скрипка) is a folkloric song of Ukraine, also known for the first words in its text  “Сіла птаха” meaning “A Bird sat down”. 
	
The song was composed in 1971 by Ігор Поклад (Ihor Poklad) (December 10, 1941) who composed the music, and the lyrics by the poet, also Ukrainian nationality, Юрій Рибчинський (Yuri Rybczinskiy) (May 22, 1945), both still alive today.	

Both knew each other during their duty at the army in 1968, and together wrote musical hits like “Two Wings”, “The Magic Violin”, “Still Waters”, “Wild Geese”, “Is it Possible?”, and many others. From 1973, Ihor dedicates himself to write for the Theater, including the composition of many Operettes.  Regarding to Yuri Ribczinskiy, was born poet, and his mother wrote also her own poetry work; he calls himself  “The Child of Victory”,and has dedicated his entire life to the study of Ukrainian folklore, and, same as Ihor Poklad, has received a lartge quiantity of prizes during his career.

Original lyrics 
Сіла птаха білокрила на тополю,
Сіло сонце понад вечір за поля.
Покохала, покохала я до болю
Молодого, молодого скрипаля.

Покохала, зачарована струною,
Заблукала та мелодія в гаю.
В гай зелений журавлиною весною
Я принесла своє серце скрипалю.*

Йшла до нього, наче місячна царівна,
Йшла до нього, як до березня весна.
І не знала, що та музика чарівна
Не для мене, а для іншої луна.

Покохала, зачарована струною,
Заблукала у березовім гаю,
І понесла журавлиною весною
В гай зелений своє серце скрипалю"

English translation

The original song text has been translated to Spanish by Dr. Fabián Abdala Marzá, who lives in the city of Kyiv, Ukraine, and dedicates to teach at the university and promote the translation and diffusion of the Ukrainian song to the Spanish speaking world.

Over a Poplar tree, a White winged bird sat down,
The sun at the sunset hid behind the fields.
Of a Young man, a Young fiddler,
I felt in love, felt in love until I got pain.

He made me love him with his magical string,
But that melody, in the grove got lost
And in this Little forest in the spring of cranes,
I, fiddler, gave you my heart.

Like a moon Princess I walked to him,
Towards him I was going, like the spring to March.
I didn't know this magical music,
Wasn't for me, but to other girl.

He made me love him thru his magical string,
But in the birch tree forest got lost,
And in the spring of the cranes,
In the green grove, to the fiddler gave my heart.

Singers
The song “The magic violin” has been interpreted by numerous artist in the music world,  from Ukraine and also from the URSS since it was written; but between the more known, and who are identified with this song, is the famous “Lybid Trío”, created in 1989 whose members are Lydia Mihaylenko, Natalia Reshetnyk and Valentina Mikhailova.
More recently is interpreted by the famous Ukrainian singer Таисия Повалий (Taysyya Povaliy).

Simbolism
Like much of the Ukrainian song, this piece contains deep symbology in its text. These are some of the more interesting elements:

птах (Bird) 
Birds represent messengers, with good or bad news; to the tree of the world or the tree of life, the creation of universe, the origin of life (thru the egg); birds connect two worlds ( and in the case of aquatic birds, three): earth and sky; they symbolize sometimes the elements, in their case air, and this comes in all parts and places.
Some birds, overall fabulous, symboliza dreams, destiny, fate and luck.

Білий (White)
A symbol of innocence and joy. It's a sign that one person enters the world of light.

ТОПОЛЯ (Poplar-Tree) 

Symbolizes the young single maid, the image of a girl waiting for her fate. Represents the fine and delicate nature, beautiful since her youth, and that resists itself to grow, to mature.

Сонце (Sun)
The source of life, determines all what happens in nature, even to men. 
It is believed that sun, moon and stars  forma the “celestial family”, that symbolizes motherhood, marriage.

Foreign art
The song has been very known in the entire world, that even in distant foreign countries like Guatemala (Central America) an artist has inspired herself in the feelings of the musical piece and painted this Inks and Oils inspired on it.

External links
Сонце
Символіка кольорів
Тополя
Тріо Либідь - пісні, біографія - Українські пісні
Юрій Рибчинський - пісні, біографія - Українські пісні
тріо Либідь - Чарівна скрипка (І.Поклад - Ю.Рибчинський) слушать бесплатно онлайн

1971 songs
Ukrainian songs
Songs about musical instruments